Primera División de México (Mexican First Division) Apertura 2003 is a Mexican football tournament - one of two short tournaments that take up the entire year to determine the champion(s) of Mexican football. It began on Saturday 2 August 2003, and ran until 22 November, when the regular season ended. Irapuato was promoted to the Primera División de México to play this tournament, and Cuernavaca was to be relegated to the Primera División A. The Cuernavaca did not get to play in Primera A, though, as the team was disbanded by FMF. On 20 December, Pachuca defeated Tigres UANL and became champions for the third time.

Overview
Necaxa moved from Mexico City to Aguascalientes.

Final standings (groups)

League table

Results

Top goalscorers 
Players sorted first by goals scored, then by last name. Only regular season goals listed.

Source: MedioTiempo

Playoffs

Repechage

Toluca won 6–4 on aggregate.

Cruz Azul won 4–1 on aggregate.

Bracket

Quarterfinals

2–2 on aggregate. UANL advanced for being the higher seeded team.

Toluca won 4–2 on aggregate.

Pachuca won 4–3 on aggregate.

Atlante won 5–3 on aggregate.

Semifinals

UANL won 2–1 on aggregate.

Pachuca won 2–1 on aggregate.

Finals

Pachuca won 3–2 on aggregate.

References

External links
 Mediotiempo.com (where information was obtained)

Mexico
Apertura